Juan Carlos Chávez (born 11 December 1972) is a Bolivian former footballer. He played in eight matches for the Bolivia national football team from 1991 to 1995. He was also part of Bolivia's squad for the 1991 Copa América tournament.

References

External links
 

1972 births
Living people
Bolivian footballers
Bolivia international footballers
Place of birth missing (living people)
Association football defenders
Club Blooming players
Oriente Petrolero players
The Strongest players
Club Destroyers players